Marshal of Cedar Rock is a 1953 American Western film directed by Harry Keller and starring Allan Lane, Phyllis Coates and Eddy Waller.

The film's art direction was by Frank Hotaling.

Plot

Cast
 Allan Lane as Marshal Rocky Lane  
 Black Jack as Rocky's Horse  
 Eddy Waller as Nugget Clark  
 Phyllis Coates as Martha Clark  
 Roy Barcroft as Henry Mason  
 William Henry as Bill Anderson  
 Robert Shayne as Paul Jackson / Fake John Harper  
 John Crawford as Henchman Chris Peters  
 John Hamilton as Prison Warden Stover  
 Kenneth MacDonald as Sheriff Blake  
 Herbert Lytton as John Harper
 Art Dillard as Henchman  
 John Marshall as Bank Clerk  
 Joe Yrigoyen as Baylor

References

Bibliography
 Bernard A. Drew. Motion Picture Series and Sequels: A Reference Guide. Routledge, 2013.

External links
 

1953 films
1953 Western (genre) films
American Western (genre) films
Films directed by Harry Keller
Republic Pictures films
American black-and-white films
1950s English-language films
1950s American films